Kulich is surname. Notable people with the surname include:
Vladimir Kulich (born 1956), Czech-Canadian actor
Michael Kulich (1986–2016), American pornographic film director

See also
Kulič (surname)
Kulić, surname
Kulick, surname

Surnames from nicknames